Modal fictionalism is a term used in philosophy, and more specifically in the metaphysics of modality, to describe the position that holds that modality can be analysed in terms of a fiction about possible worlds. The theory comes in two versions: Strong and Timid. Both positions were first exposed by Gideon Rosen starting from 1990.

Strong fictionalism about possible worlds

According to strong fictionalism about possible worlds (another name for strong modal fictionalism), the following bi-conditionals are necessary and specify the truth-conditions for certain cases of modal claims:
 It is possible that P iff the translation of P into the language of a fiction F (containing possible worlds) holds according to F.
 It is necessary that P iff the translation of P into the language of a fiction F (containing possible worlds) always holds.

Recent supporters of this view added further specifications of these bi-conditionals to counter certain objections. In the case of claims of possibility, the revised bi-conditional is thus spelled out: (1.1) it is possible that P iff At this universe, presently, the translation of P into the language of a fiction F holds according to F.

Timid fictionalism about possible worlds

According to a timid version of fictionalism about possible worlds, our possible worlds can be properly understood as involving reference to a fiction, but the aforementioned bi-conditionals should not be taken as an analysis of certain cases of modality.

Objections and criticisms

 The Brock/Rosen objection
 Artificiality

This objection can be spelled out in at least two ways: artificiality as contingency or artificiality as lack of accessibility.

 Hale dilemma
 Incompleteness
 Fictional fetishism

See also
 Fictionalism

References

 "Modal fictionalism" at the Stanford Encyclopedia of Philosophy
 "Modal Fictionalism and Possible Worlds Semantics" at the Stanford Encyclopedia of Philosophy
  Gideon Rosen, 'Modal Fictionalism', Mind, 99, 395 (1990), pp. 327–354.
  Seahwa Kim, 'Modal Fictionalism and Analysis', in Mark Eli Kalderon (ed.), Fictionalism in Metaphysics (Oxford:Oxford University Press, 2005), pp. 116–33.
  Andrea Sauchelli, 'Modal Fictionalism, Possible Worlds, and Artificiality', Acta Analytica (forthcoming)

Theories of deduction
Possible worlds
Metaphysical theories